Carrenza M. "Schoolboy" Howard (January 10, 1914 – February 1, 2003) was an American right-handed baseball pitcher in the Negro leagues. He played from 1940 to 1947, mostly with the New York Cubans and the Indianapolis Clowns.

While pitching with the Cubans in 1944, he was credited with a 24-4 record against all opponents, though in his first two years with the team, his league ledger shows marks of 0-1 and 2-1. Records note that most of the teams games were played during that time were non-league teams.

Howard was born in Daytona Beach, Florida. While attending Shaw University in Raleigh, North Carolina, he was a three-time letterman, thus earning his nickname, "Schoolboy."

His birthdate is sometimes listed as 1920.

References

External links
 and Seamheads

  

1914 births
2003 deaths
Indianapolis Clowns players
New York Cubans players
Baseball players from Florida
20th-century African-American sportspeople
Baseball pitchers
21st-century African-American people